Qaryat Bishr  is a Mediterranean coastal town on the Gulf of Sidra in central-northeastern Libya. It is in the Al Wahat District of the Cyrenaica region.

It was in the former Ajdabiya District until 2007.

References

Populated coastal places in Libya
Gulf of Sidra
Populated places in Al Wahat District
Cyrenaica